Patrick Karam (born 8 February 1961) is a French personality defending human rights. He is a researcher in international relations.

Early life and education 
Of Lebanese origin, Karam lived and followed his schooling in Guadeloupe and obtained his Baccalauréat C (scientific series of the time) at Lycée Baimbridge in Guadeloupe. He holds a doctorate in political science (University of Burgundy in Dijon).

Career 
A former Interministerial Delegate for Equal Opportunities for French Overseas under President Nicolas Sarkozy, he has been serving as regional advisor of Île-de-France (UMP) since 2010 and Inspector General of Youth and Sports since 2011. He is the president of the Coordination of the Christians of East in Danger (CHREDO) established in September 2013. He is the first president of the Representative Council of the French Overseas. Since December 2015 he has been vice-president of the regional council of Ile de France, responsible for youth, sports and community life.

Human rights 
From 1987 to 1989, Karam created and directed human rights and inter-youth solidarity, a humanitarian aid organization carrying out sister city of French schools with African schools and Lebanese. He also worked with Operation Save the Children of Lebanon during the 1989 bombings in Lebanese Civil War , which mobilized 150,000 children and thousands of schools (bringing together their drawings, poems, letters ... addressed to four heads of state).

Political positions 
Ahead of the Republicans’ 2016 primaries, Karam endorsed Nicolas Sarkozy as the party’s candidate for 2017 presidential elections.

References 

1961 births
Living people
French activists
People from Pointe-à-Pitre
French people of Lebanese descent
Union for a Popular Movement politicians
The Republicans (France) politicians
Chevaliers of the Légion d'honneur
Paris Descartes University alumni
Pantheon-Sorbonne University alumni